Joaquim da Rocha Ferreira da Costa, known as Ferreira da Costa (born 1 November 1953) is a former Portuguese football player and coach.

He played 14 seasons and 295 games in the Primeira Liga for Vitória de Guimarães, Penafiel, Chaves, Sporting Espinho and Porto.

Club career
He made his Primeira Liga debut for Porto on 15 April 1973 in a game against Atlético CP.

References

External links

1953 births
People from Gondomar, Portugal
Living people
Portuguese footballers
Association football midfielders
FC Porto players
Primeira Liga players
S.C. Espinho players
Vitória S.C. players
F.C. Penafiel players
G.D. Chaves players
Portuguese football managers
Primeira Liga managers
C.S. Marítimo managers
Sportspeople from Porto District